The Institut de Chimie des Substances Naturelles ("Institute for the chemistry of natural substances"), or ICSN, is part of the Centre national de la recherche scientifique, France's most prominent public research organization. 

Located at Gif-sur-Yvette, near Paris, ICSN is France's largest state-run chemistry research institute. Built in 1959, it employs over 300 people and focuses on four research areas:

 Synthetic and methodological approaches in Organic Chemistry
 Natural products and medicinal chemistry
 Structural chemistry and structural biology
 Chemistry and biology of therapeutic targets

References
 ICSN Official website (in French and English)

Research institutes in France
Government agencies of France
Chemical research institutes